Woodards is a surname. Notable people with the surname include:

 Dan Woodards (1886–1964), English footballer
 Danny Woodards (born 1983), English footballer
 Victoria Woodards (born 1965), American politician

See also
 Woodard
 Woodward (surname)